Myrciaria strigipes, commonly known as  (beach cambucá) or  (beach, little hairy), is a species of plant in the family Myrtaceae. It is an evergreen shrub or small tree, endemic to Bahia and Espírito Santo in the east of Brazil. The plant grows up to between 4 and 9 metres tall, and produces edible yellowish fruits between 22 and 28mm in diameter. Consumed raw, the fruit has been described as tasting somewhere between Myrciaria glazioviana and Plinia cauliflora.

References

strigipes
Crops originating from the Americas
Tropical fruit
Flora of South America
Endemic flora of Brazil
Fruits originating in South America
Cauliflory
Fruit trees
Berries